Richard McKeon (April 26, 1900 – March 31, 1985) was an American philosopher and longtime professor at the University of Chicago. His ideas formed the basis for the UN's Universal Declaration of Human Rights.

Life, times, and influences
McKeon obtained his undergraduate degree from Columbia University in 1920, graduating at the early age of 20 despite serving briefly in the U.S. Navy during the First World War. Continuing at Columbia, he completed a Master's thesis on Leo Tolstoy, Benedetto Croce, and George Santayana, also in 1920, and a doctoral thesis on Baruch Spinoza in 1922. In his doctoral studies, McKeon's mentors were Frederick J. E. Woodbridge and John Dewey. From Woodbridge, McKeon would later write, he learned that "what philosophers meant might be comparable or even identical, despite differences in their modes of expression," while Dewey taught him how "to seek the significance of philosophic positions in the problems they were constructed to solve." He then studied philosophy in Paris, where his teachers included Étienne Gilson, until he began teaching at Columbia in 1925.

In 1934, McKeon was appointed visiting professor of History at the University of Chicago, beginning a 40-year association with that university. The following year, he assumed a permanent position as professor of Greek philosophy, a post he filled for twelve years. As professor and, also starting in 1935, as Dean of the Humanities, McKeon was instrumental in developing the distinguished general education program of the Hutchins era at the University of Chicago. He later founded Chicago's interdisciplinary Committee on the Analysis of Ideas and Study of Methods. He presided over the Western division of the American Philosophical Association in 1952, and over the International Institute of Philosophy from 1953 to 1957. In 1966, he gave the Paul Carus Lectures. He retired in 1974.

McKeon was a central intellectual figure in United Nations Educational, Scientific and Cultural Organization's (UNESCO) early years. He advised UNESCO when (1946–48) it studied the foundations of human rights and of the idea of democracy. These studies supplied much of the material for the drafting of the Universal Declaration of Human Rights in 1948. In 1954, under the auspices of UNESCO and the Indian Philosophical Congress, he conducted a series of eighteen roundtable discussions at Indian universities on human relations and international obligations.

McKeon was a pioneer American scholar of medieval philosophy and the history of science. He was also a prominent figure in the revival of rhetoric as an intellectual art, exploring the often problematic relation between philosophy and rhetoric. He taught Aristotle throughout his career, insisted that his was a Greek Aristotle, not one seen through the eyes of later philosophers writing in Latin. McKeon's interests later shifted from the doctrines of individuals to the dialectic of systems. He investigated pluralism, cultural diversity, and problems of communication and community, at a time when such subjects were less than fashionable.

McKeon was a founding member of "The Chicago School" of literary criticism because of his influence on several of its prominent members (e.g., Wayne Booth). Notwithstanding, McKeon distanced himself from "The Chicago School," which was mainly concerned with Neo-Aristotelian poetic theory. As a pluralist, he wished to disassociate himself from any attempt to propagandize any particular ideology, philosophy, or theorist.

A series of three volumes of "Selected Writings" from his widely scattered articles is planned by The University of Chicago Press, of which Vol. 1 ("Philosophy, Science and Culture," 1998) and Vol. 2 ("Culture, Education and the Arts," 2005) have appeared.  A collection of essays about McKeon, his pluralist philosophy, and its applications, "Pluralism in Theory and Practice:  Richard McKeon and American Philosophy" (Eugene Garver and Richard Buchanan, eds.), was written and published by his students and colleagues in 2000.

Critique of Modern Philosophy
McKeon holds that the renaissance revolt against scholasticism involved Aristotle in an "associated discredit", and few outstanding modern philosophers took the pains to examine the grounds of the criticism or to re-examine the philosophy of Aristotle.  He credits Leibniz and Hegel as exceptions. In 1941 he notes that "Aristotle has become a force again in contemporary discussions", and that his writings have "disclosed greater applicability in present day philosophic problems than they have in centuries".

Legacy

Former students of McKeon have praised him and proved influential in their own right, including novelist Robert Coover, authors Susan Sontag and Paul Goodman, theologian John Cobb, philosophers Richard Rorty and Eugene Gendlin, classicist and philosopher Kenneth A. Telford, sociologist and social theorist Donald N. Levine, anthropologist Paul Rabinow, literary theorist Wayne Booth, and poets Tom Mandel and Arnold Klein. He was also father to the literary critic Michael McKeon. Richard McKeon and the Committee on the Analysis of Ideas and Study of Methods appear under thin disguise in Robert M. Pirsig's Zen and the Art of Motorcycle Maintenance.

Philosophy and pluralism

McKeon published 158 articles over the span of seven decades. The evidence of his pluralist influence is not evident in one particular doctrine or system, but rather in a plurality of all his articles. The scope of his work extends to virtually all philosophies and to the whole cultural history of the Western world while being ordered by semantic schema.

Early in his academic career, McKeon recognized that truth has no single expression. His understanding of philosophical and historical semantics led him to value philosophies quite different from his own. He viewed the aim of pluralism as not achieving a monolithic identity but rather a diversity of opinion along with mutual tolerance. He characterized his philosophy as a philosophy of culture, but it is also humanistic, a philosophy of communications and the arts, and a philosophical rhetoric.

The value of a philosophic position is determined by demonstrating its value as an explanation or as an instrument of discovery. The pragmatism of Richard Rorty owes much to McKeon, his teacher. McKeon's operational method is a method of debate which allows one to refine their positions, and in turn, determining what limits their perception of an opponent's argument. Opposition provides a necessary perspective. Notwithstanding, it does not necessarily acquire characteristics from the perspectives with which it is opposed; his philosophy, by nature, resists being pinned down by a single name. It is not meant to affirm the value or credibility of any and all philosophies. Essentially, pluralism is closely related to objectivity; a desired outcome of communication and discussion and a fundamental goal and principle of being human.

Human beings come together around common issues and/or problems and their different interests and perspectives are often an obstacle to collective action. McKeon's pluralism insists that we understand what a person means by what they say. He believes that proper discussion can lead to agreement, courses of action, and in some cases to mutual understanding, if not, an eventual agreement on issues of ideology or philosophic belief. The work of Jürgen Habermas has close affinities to that of McKeon. Conflicting concepts, interests, and assumptions which concern society form an ecology of culture. Discussion forms an object, which is the transformation of the subject into a product that is held in common as the outcome. McKeon's philosophy is similar to rhetoric as conceived by Aristotle, whereby it has the power to be employed in any given situation as the available means of persuasion.

The pluralism of perspectives is an essential component to our existence. Nonetheless, the effort to form our individual perspectives through thought and action brings us into touch with being human and being with other individuals. For McKeon, an understanding of pluralism gives us access to whatever may be grasped of being itself.

The New Rhetoric

In the later stages of McKeon's academic career, he started giving more attention to world problems (see UNESCO). He sought to improve individual disciplines as he felt that they were meant to improve mankind. Refurbishing rhetoric was necessary, he argued, because outlining the needs for, antecedents of, tasks imposed upon, and general character and affiliations of rhetoric would both solve problems and communicate solutions for people everywhere.

As our age produces new data and experiences, we require a new, expanded rhetoric which takes into account technology. The modern world has progressed quite far but it has not yet found a logos which is able to make sense of techne (technology = techne + logos). The sciences alone cannot hope to be productive without reincorporating rhetoric otherwise they would only be analytic. For McKeon a new rhetoric is the only means of bridging the gap between arts and sciences. Incorporating rhetoric may permit the further development of new fields of arts and sciences. Rhetoric is able to navigate among the various kinds of arts and sciences providing an opportunity to interrelate them and set new ends which makes use of both spheres. The new rhetoric can order all the other arts and sciences resulting in new discoveries. Mckeon deemed a very forceful rhetorical strategy capable of avoiding relativism as with a very forceful rhetorical strategy a solidarity is gained as people are supposedly unified via a forceful rhetoric. Relativism is avoided according to McKeon via the force of a rhetorical strategy rather than via access to a Platonic realm.

McKeon borrows traditional rhetorical terms (see Aristotle and Quintilian) to outline the principles of the new rhetoric (creativity/invention; fact/judgment; sequence/consequence; objectivity/intersubjectivity) and then leads them toward brighter avenues of discovery by enlarging Aristotle's traditional rhetorical categories (epideictic, judicial, deliberative) and reintegrating philosophical dialectic. He believes that the materials for doing this are topoi and schemata. The new rhetoric must be universal, objective, reformulate the structure and program of verbal rhetoric and its subjects, and its applications must be focused on the particular now. For McKeon the now is to be 'mined' to contribute to the future resolution of an important problematic. Here again the impact of McKeon on Richard Rorty is evident. Along with John Dewey, McKeon (as Rorty does) deemed philosophy to be basically a problem-solving endeavor. Basically there are two sorts of solidarity sought by those who employ a rhetorical strategy: the solidarity of those who have a goal and the solidarity of those who have 'values'. In other words, solidarity can be sought by those who have no 'values' but rather a rhetoric or by those who have no goal but rather 'values'.

New data may cause new problems for rhetoric, but it will still continue to produce categories and attempt to find new kinds of topoi which will produce new classifications and create new interdisciplinary fields. Rhetoric helps to figure out how to create these fields, or how to decide which existing fields are appropriate for various data. The new rhetoric will find new kinds of ends, by putting technology in the service of ends in collaboration with other arts rather than allowing technology to lead us to restricted and potentially harmful ends. Whatever 'values' are deemed to lead to the solution of a problem are rhetorically deemed worthy. The problematic is all for McKeon, and rhetoric is supposed to contribute to the solution of the problematic. Clearly rhetoric is unable to come up with a clear plan for a solution, rhetoric being rhetoric. Rather via rhetoric, 'values' are enunciated which are supposed to eventually gain the goal. One who employs rhetoric to gain a goal is basically attempting via brute force to gain an end.

Assuming a goal is gained, a corollary of rhetoric is that those who had the end as an end now abandon the end, eschew the end as a 'value', and now develop new goals and new rhetorics. This is getting way ahead of the game, though, given the track record of rhetoric. Rhetoric has been repeatedly tried down the centuries  and has repeatedly been associated with disaster though this is irrelevant for those attempting a rhetoric, as rhetoric is deemed to achieve goals by brute force by those who practice rhetoric, but rhetoric has also failed to achieve ends. Those who have espoused a rhetoric have achieved valued though precarious positions. The work of Richard McKeon shows that, despite multiple, great failures, even up to the 20th century, rhetoric following Aristotle continued to 'put a spell over people'.

Cultural influence
McKeon was cited extensively in Marshall McLuhan's 1943 doctoral dissertation The Place of Thomas Nashe in the Learning of His Time (since published as ).

In Robert Pirsig's 1974 novel Zen and the Art of Motorcycle Maintenance, he is the "Chairman of the Committee".

Philosopher Marjorie Grene, writing in her "Philosophical Autobiography" about the 1944 termination of her seven-year teaching role at the University of Chicago, stated bluntly (without elaborating) that "McKeon had me fired."

Bibliography
1928: The Philosophy of Spinoza: The Unity of His Thought.
1929: Selections from Medieval Philosophers
Vol. 1 Augustine to Albert the Great
Vol. 2 Roger Bacon to William of Ockham
1941: .
1947: Introduction to Aristotle.
1951: Democracy in a World of Tensions: A Symposium Prepared by UNESCO.
1952: Freedom and History: The Semantics of Philosophical Controversies and Ideological Conflicts.
1954: Thought, Action, and Passion. University of Chicago Press.  Reprinted 1974.
1957: The Freedom to Read: Perspective and Program.
1959: The Edicts of Asoka. With N.A. Nikam.  University of Chicago Press.
1971: Gli studi umanistici nel mondo attuale.
1976: Peter Abailard, Sic et Non: A Critical Edition.
1987: Rhetoric: Essays in Invention and Discovery. Edited with introduction by Mark Backman. Ox Bow Press. 
1990. Freedom and History and Other Essays: An Introduction to the Thought of Richard McKeon. Edited by Zahava K. McKeon. University of Chicago Press.
1994. On Knowing—The Natural Sciences.  Edited by David B. Owen and Zahava K. McKeon. University of Chicago Press.
1998. Selected Writings of Richard McKeon, Vol. 1. McKeon, Zahava K., and William G. Swenson, eds. University of Chicago Press. 
2005. Selected Writings of Richard McKeon, Vol. 2. McKeon, Zahava K., and William G. Swenson, eds. University of Chicago Press.

See also
 American philosophy
 List of American philosophers

Notes and references

Further reading
 Baranowski, Brad. "The unending conversation: Kenneth Burke and Richard McKeon's aesthetic pragmatism, 1920–1960." Modern Intellectual History 15.1 (2018): 153-184 online.
Garver, Eugene, and Buchanan, Richard, 2000. Pluralism In Theory and Practice. Vanderbilt University Press. 
Kimball Plochman, George, 1990. Richard McKeon. University of Chicago Press. 
Levine, Donald,  2007. Powers of the Mind: The Reinvention of Liberal Learning. University of Chicago Press.
Obermiller, Tim Andrew, December 1995, "Richard McKeon," The University of Chicago Alumnae Magazine.
 Rosenboim, Or. The Emergence of Globalism: Visions of World Order in Britain and the United States, 1939–1950 (2017) pp 170–210 on "Writing a World Constitution."
 Selinger, William. "The Forgotten Philosopher: A Review Essay on Richard McKeon." Review of Politics 80.1 (2018): 137–150 
 Simonson, Peter. "Richard McKeon in the Pragmatist Tradition." in Recovering Overlooked Pragmatists in Communication. (Palgrave Macmillan, Cham, 2019) pp. 23–51.

External links
Kissel, Adam, 2006, "Richard McKeon ," The University of Chicago. Bibliography of, and excerpts from, McKeon.
"Richard McKeon: Episteme; Philosophic Semantics and Philosophic Inquiry." Information on McKeon.
"richardmckeon.org" Biographical Information, Bibliography, and Selected Publications.
Guide to the Richard Peter McKeon Papers 1918-1985 at the University of Chicago Special Collections Research Center

1900 births
1985 deaths
People from Hudson County, New Jersey
Columbia College (New York) alumni
Robert M. Pirsig
University of Chicago faculty
American historians of philosophy
Historians of science
Rhetoric theorists
20th-century American philosophers
Metaphysicians
American scholars of ancient Greek philosophy
Scholars of medieval philosophy
20th-century American historians
Presidents of the Metaphysical Society of America
American male non-fiction writers
Aristotelian philosophers
Historians from New Jersey
Columbia Graduate School of Arts and Sciences alumni